Kastner is a German language surname, originating from the medieval occupation Kastner ("bursary officer"). It may refer to:

 Bruno Kastner (1890–1932), German actor
 Daniel Kastner (born 1981), Austrian footballer
Daniel L. Kastner (fl. 2020), American researcher and physician
 Elliott Kastner (1930–2010), American film producer
 Jean-Georges Kastner  (1810–1867), French composer and musicologist
 John Kastner (born 1969), Canadian musician and composer 
 Karl Wilhelm Gottlob Kastner (1783–1857), chemist, natural scientist
 Karl Kastner (died 1921)
 Kastner & Öhler, Austrian department store chain
 Kas Kastner, racing driver, racing car builder, racing team manager
 Marc A. Kastner (born 1945), American physicist
 Peter Kastner (1943 – 2008), Canadian born actor
 Rudolf Kastner (1906–1957), Jewish-Hungarian lawyer, head of the Hungarian Aid and Rescue Committee during the Holocaust
 Kastner train, after Rudolf Kastner 
 Sabine Kastner (* 1964), German-born American cognitive neuroscientist
 Susanne Kastner (born 1946), German politician (SPD)

See also
 Costner
 Kästner
 Kestner

Occupational surnames
German-language surnames